Class of the Titans is a Canadian animated television series produced by Studio B Productions and Nelvana Limited. It premiered on December 31, 2005, at 5 pm ET/PT on Teletoon with a special 90-minute presentation of the first three episodes. The series aired in the United States on Jetix from February 9, 2006 to July 14, 2008. The series also aired on Qubo from September 19, 2009, to October 24, 2009. On April 1, 2012, the series returned to Qubo as part of its Qubo Night Owl block replacing "Spliced" where it remained until July 25, 2020.

The series was released on DVD. The first three episodes were released on February 19, 2008, as Chaos and includes a behind-the-scenes featurette. The second DVD, Trojan Horse, was released on May 20, 2008, and contains episodes 4–6. "Class of the Titans: Vol. 1 Season 1" was released November 18, 2008 and contains episodes 1–13. No further episodes were released on DVD.

In 2016, Amazon has uploaded the show on its video streaming website Amazon Prime, listing it broken into 4 "seasons".

In 2019, Retro Rerun has begun uploading the episodes to their YouTube channel.

Synopsis
The feared titan of time Cronus escapes from Tartarus' prison after thousands of years of imprisonment when the planets aligned on New Year's Eve. Now an ancient prophecy predicts that seven teen heroes (Jay, Atlanta, Herry, Archie, Theresa, Odie, and Neil) will be the ones to defeat Cronus once and for all.

All the Ancient Greek characters have their original Greek names except Heracles, as the Romans called Hercules.

Characters

Main
Jay (voiced by Kirby Morrow) – "The Leader", descendant of Jason of the Argonauts. Jay is 16 years old and the first of the teenagers to be located. He has an instinct for leadership and wields a xiphos with a retractable blade. He is of Greek heritage on his mother's side, and thus grew up with the stories of classical mythology. If the other teenagers are confused about a certain mythological concept, he usually explains it to them. Jay takes his role as a hero very seriously, usually worrying about potential threats even when everything seems fine. His sense of responsibility and focused work ethic tends to drive the group mildly insane. Sailing seems to be his favorite hobby. He has very strong feelings for Theresa. In the first episode that she appears, he asks if she can read minds, which implies that he doesn't want her to know he likes her. The two of them share a passionate kiss in the season 2 finale. Jay is analyzed as the everyman, taking into account the well-being of his friends and respecting each and every one of their abilities. His mentor is Hera.
Atlanta (voiced by Meghan Black in season 1, Sarah Edmondson in season 2) – "The Hunter", descendant of Artemis. Atlanta is 15 years old, one of the youngest of the heroes, and the only chosen one with a female ancestor. After Jay, she was the next person Hermes found. She was born and raised in the Northwest Territories and was brought up around weapons and such, which explains her odd passion for dangerous weapons. She has exceptional reflexes and tracking abilities, and uses either jaw-trap steel bolas or crossbow gauntlet as her weapon of choice. Atlanta has a bit of a one-track mind, preferring to act rather than think things through, likes to tease Archie (mostly about his fear of water), and is very short-tempered. At the same time, she's very studious to the point of being neurotic. She also has an interest in environmental issues and volunteers for the Green Alliance, though she also enjoys hunting with traditional weapons such as bow and arrows and has a scar on her right shoulder from an incident with a puma. Atlanta has no interest in dating, but she did have a crush on Phil and gradually developed feelings for Archie. There are hints earlier in the show when she gets jealous if Archie pays attention to other girls. While initially reluctant to change their relationship beyond that of close friends, she eventually decides that she cares for him in the same way he does for her. Atlanta is also a player on Olympus High's field hockey team, along with Theresa. Her mentor is Artemis.    
Herry (voiced by Ty Olsson) – "The Brawn", descendant of Hercules, who is also his mentor. A 16-year-old farm boy and the third to be discovered, he completed the initial trio of teens that Hermes brought to Olympus High, with the other four being introduced in subsequent episodes. He has superhuman strength and thus tends not to wield a weapon in favor of using brute strength alone, but can be improvisational and learn to use just about anything when the need arises. Herry is laid-back and easy-going, but can be easy to anger, which can sometimes lead him into trouble. He has a big appetite and is fond of his grandmother, "Granny", who appears to have raised him. His teammates sometimes belittle his intelligence, though at times he's shown to be quite smart, especially when it comes to thinking of quick solutions. Granny is the only parental figure that seems to know about Herry and the other heroes as of Episode 12 and even is familiar with Zeus. Herry drives (and is slightly protective of) a pickup truck which his Granny passed onto him and was redesigned and equipped by Hephaestus to become the group's official ride. 
Archie (voiced by Sam Vincent) – "The Warrior", descendant of Achilles. The fourth teen brought to Olympus High, Archie is 15 years old and he is one of the youngest heroes. He is super agile, almost as fast as Atlanta, and wields a "Hephaestus Whip," a seeming cross between a chain whip and a rope dart that is eventually upgraded by Hephaestus into the "Adamantine Whip". Unlike his ancestor, Archie wears a distinctive gold brace covering his right shin and part of the foot due to an unspecified medical condition affecting his heel. Also, according to Dionysus, Archie is invincible to disease like Achilles was, and has never been sick a day of his life (though he does have a scar, as mentioned in "Sibling Rivalry"). In addition to his various physical abilities, Archie is also knowledgeable about Greek mythology from reading a lot of Greek poetry. Archie tends to be brash, macho, somewhat insensitive, and has a slight tendency to show off, but also tends to keep to himself and is rather cynical.  His skepticism extends towards the supernatural, resulting in his initial hostility toward Theresa, brushing off her abilities as predictions and blatantly ignoring her, though they eventually iron out their differences. Archie has also been attracted to Atlanta since they first met, but unfortunately, he does not have the courage to confess his feelings, though he did kiss her on the cheek once in "Little Box of Horrors" while she was unconscious after being infected by the Seeper. Atlanta, for her part, is apparently oblivious to Archie's affections and instead, the two of them are always competing to best the other. When he openly tells her his feelings in "The Deep End", she is initially wary of such a change in their relationship, but later tells him she likes him as well. He has an irrational fear of water and refuses to swim, though Atlanta eventually helps him get past this fear. Archie's mentor is Ares.
Theresa (voiced by Kelly Sheridan) – "The Fighter", descendant of Theseus. Theresa is introduced with Odie as the sixth and fifth teens discovered respectively. Theresa is 16 years old and her birthday takes places around the premiere episode, making her the oldest of the group. She comes from a wealthy family. Her father, who owns cattle ranches across Canada, is very preoccupied with his work (his lack of attention to anything else annoys her). She is very wealthy and is used to the finer things in life, much like her mentor Persephone. A black belt in taekwondo at 12 years old, she has excellent fighting skills and is armed with nunchucks. She has a natural sense of direction as well as a sixth sense, akin to clairvoyance or psychometry, enabling her to sometimes foresee the outcome of Cronus' schemes and the Olympians' plans or detect danger. Her psychic abilities have since further developed, including telepathic and telekinetic powers. She has strong feelings for Jay. There are many hints throughout the series indicating that the creators are leaning on them as a couple, especially given that they are frequently seen together. She is deeply concerned about him and shows determination to save him when he was killed in "Road to Hades." But his determination to thwart Cronus has led her to feel frustrated towards him. She also is a talented lyre player, something she is very reluctant to admit to others. Like Atlanta, she also plays on Olympus High's field hockey team. In the season finale, Theresa is pushed too far by the Gods, causing her powers to go out of control in the form of an evil spirit which drains the powers of most of the gods. She even managed to drain the powers of Cronus, which helped the Chosen Ones to defeat him, fulfilling the Oracle's prophecy. After draining Zeus, she declares that she and Jay are free now but is horrified to find Jay has been told to kill her by Hera. Jay tries to convince her that the combined powers of the gods will destroy her, only for the Phantom to toss Jay aside, causing her to realize she has gone too far. She is then overwhelmed by her immense power and dies, but Jay revives her with a kiss. She is portrayed as second-in-command (to Jay) and assumes leadership duties when Jay is incapacitated.
Odie (voiced by Doron Bell Jr.) – "The Brains", descendant of Odysseus. Odie is introduced with Theresa as the fifth and sixth teens discovered respectively. He is usually seen as the youngest of the group due to being physically smaller than the other heroes, but is actually one of the oldest heroes at 16 years of age. He has super intelligence, cleverness and extremely advanced skills with all types of electronics. He is also the group's tactician and the first to come up with a plan. He has no official weapon, but usually uses a walkie-talkie and an amazingly well-equipped laptop given to him by Hermes. Odie managed to befriend Polyphemus, whom his ancestor Odysseus had blinded during his Odyssey. Unlike the other six teenagers, who seem to be Caucasian, Odie is Black. He wears green-tinted glasses, likes virtual reality video games, and suffers from claustrophobia, which he can overpower with a specially designed device placing the location elsewhere (in his mind). His mentor is Hermes.
Neil (voiced by Ted Cole) – "The Good Looking", descendant of Narcissus. The last of the seven to join the group, Neil is 16 years old and exceptionally handsome, working as a freelance model and having his photos plastered all over New Olympia. His lifestyle made him a spoiled brat, and the others initially harbored some doubts of his status as a "hero". He always has a monogrammed three-paneled mirror on-hand, which includes an autographed picture of himself that flips out of the middle mirror. Neil considers himself to be quite cultured and an all-around fashion expert, and is easily upset if his clothes become dirty or spotted. He is notorious for being late and is also obsessed with horror films focused on vampires and werewolves. However, he is extremely lucky, which helps defeat far more powerful foes, as well as help him with minor things like always winning coin tosses and board games. Neil generally does not wield a weapon, but when he does is able to do so with great effect, likely because of his natural luck. He emits a high-pitched girlish scream when frightened, and his worst fears are, not surprisingly, becoming bald, gaining weight, and developing skin problems. He also snores quite loudly when he sleeps to the irritation of the other teen heroes. Despite his self-centered attitude, Neil does care deeply for his friends and will do whatever he can to help them when they need him most, even if it means putting aside the well-being of himself and his hair, though he does enjoy making fun of Odie, but Jay often tells him to back off. His mentor is Aphrodite.
Cronus (voiced by David Kaye) – The main antagonist of the series. Cronus's character combines the roles of Cronus, the king of the Titans, and Chronos, the personification of time. Cronus was imprisoned since the Titanomachy in Tartarus by his sons Zeus, Poseidon, and Hades. With the aligning of the planets on New Year's Eve, he is able to escape and exact revenge on Zeus and the Olympians as well as take over the world. Having harbored such long-standing grudges, Cronus often has no trouble persuading his allies to take out their anger on the heroes' modern descendants. He also controls a number of giants and has been known to form alliances with the old foes of the original heroes. As one of the most powerful immortals in existence, Cronus has numerous powers, such as regeneration, creating portals, shapeshifting, and duplicating himself. As the god of time, he is able to reverse and speed up time, but these powers weaken when used often. He wields one or two black and gold scythes that materialize out of thin air. Cronus usually wears a black toga and gold bracers, but mostly wears a black business suit to blend in with the modern world.

Supporting
Chiron (voiced by Bruce Greenwood in season 1, Richard Newman in season 2) – A centaur who serves as a "human" encyclopedia of sorts, providing information and tidbits of mythological knowledge. He has acted as a mentor for various heroes, and also takes care of them when any of them are hurt in battle.
 Granny (voiced by Peter Kelamis) – Herry's grandmother, who is very fond of her grandchild and initially appears frail, but later shows lot of spunk and energy for a woman her age.
The Horae – More commonly referred to as the Seasons. They consist of the Fall Horae, the Winter Horae, the Spring Horae (voiced by Kathleen Barr), and the Summer Horae. Inhabiting a mural that leads to the Underworld from Persephone's solarium, they regulate the seasons and appear as four maidens. They also possess the ability to control time (specifically visiting past seasons), though Cronus is much more powerful than them.
 The Oracle (voiced by Brian Drummond) – An old bald man with strange glowing eyes, usually concealed with sunglasses, who can foresee the future and is obligated to give such information to those who request it. Despite having few appearances in season 1, he becomes a recurring character in season 2, usually approached by Theresa whenever she begins to doubt her psychic abilities.

Greek gods
Aphrodite (voiced by Tabitha St. Germain) – Neil's mentor and the goddess of love and beauty. She is an air-headed woman who loves good-looking people, especially herself. She seems to spend most of her time either making herself look even more beautiful or admiring herself in the mirror; as such, her beauty and obsession with it make her the ideal mentor for Neil.
Apollo (voiced by Trevor Devall) - The twin brother of Artemis, and god of the sun. Unlike all other depictions of Apollo, he appears as a pot-bellied man with facial hair and an Italian accent. Also, unlike other gods, he appears to be out of touch with modern style, although he owns a boombox.
Ares (voiced by Garry Chalk) – Archie's mentor, who is the god of war. He provides the kids with an extensive array of weapons and helps to train them properly in the ways of fighting. While Ares favors armed and hand-to-hand combat, he also understands the art of war and recognizes the importance of tactics and strategy as well as luck in battle. He tends to be short-tempered and arrogant, and is difficult to get along with, similar to Archie.
Artemis (voiced by Patricia Drake) – Atlanta's mentor, who is the goddess of the hunt, wild animals, and the moon. Unsurprisingly, she and her student Atlanta are both great hunters and skilled in archery. She is a decisive and straightforward woman who seems to have limited patience and enjoys competition.
Athena (voiced by Kathleen Barr) – Head of the dorm, and goddess of war and wisdom. Surprisingly, she is a good cook and skilled weaver, the latter of which is unsurprising given that she is also the goddess of domestic arts. Her weapon of choice is a Makhaira, which she also doesn't mind using to slice stacks of toast for her charges.
Demeter (voiced by Maxine Miller) - The mother of Persephone, and goddess of the harvest. She becomes very angry when her daughter is trapped and accidentally causes an eternal winter in the process, referencing the myth of Persephone's abduction by Hades. When Neil and Atlanta arrive at her farm, Demeter has taken the form of a cow. They charm her enough to ease the winter, and she lends them her chariot to go to the Underworld and help the others save Persephone. When Persephone returns to the living world, Demeter restores the natural order and reunites with her daughter, much like in the myth.
Dionysus (voiced by Michael Daingerfield) - The god of wine and leisure, who is depicted as a skilled chemist. He believes that every mistake you make will cause you to become more knowledgeable, which Odie is slightly doubtful of.
Eris (voiced by Lara Gilchrist) - The goddess of discord, who appears as a teenage punk and enjoys graffiti art. Her powers affect both heroes and gods, causing them to argue instead of working together.
Eros (voiced by Terry Klassen) - The son of Aphrodite, who is the god of love. He hates using his more familiar Roman name of Cupid, and only allows Psyche to call him that. He is shown as a short, slightly overweight, balding' middle-aged man who lives in the suburbs.
Fortuna (voiced by Nicole Oliver) - The goddess of fortune, a middle-aged woman who owns the Cornucopia and loves to gamble at the casino.
Hades (voiced by Trevor Devall) – The god of the underworld, who in contrast to other depictions of Hades is portrayed as a man with a high-pitched voice and purple complexion as well as an apparently friendly personality. He has an affectionate relationship with his wife Persephone and has no problems with the heroes coming and going from the Underworld. However, he rules his kingdom with a strong hold and has no qualms with expressing his wrath to those who have overstepped themselves.
Harmony (voiced by Judith Maxey) - The goddess of harmony, who takes the form of a large pink snake and works as a radio DJ.
Hecate (voiced by Patricia Drake) - The goddess of witchcraft.
Hephaestus (voiced by Brian Drummond) – The blacksmith of the gods, who makes the group's vehicles and is the god of fire, smithing, and craftsmanship. His workshop is filled with various mechanical devices and explosives for the heroes' usage. He is also lame with his right leg being somewhat shorter than the left, although he has special boots that solve the problem. Odie studies with him as well as with Hermes, though Hephaestus and Odie clash over the superiority of modern technology versus ancient magical innovation.
Hera (voiced by Patricia Drake) – Jay's mentor and the queen of the gods. She is a stern, regal and elderly woman with a commanding presence, and acts as principal of Olympus High. Like her student, Jay, she is a natural leader and was the patron goddess who championed his ancestor, Jason. As with Jason, Hera seems to take an active role in assisting Jay in his role as leader.
Hercules (voiced by Garry Chalk) – Herry's mentor, the gatekeeper of Olympus and God of averting evil and patron of athletes. By this era, he has the appearance of a middle-aged, pot-bellied, balding man with a heart tattoo on his biceps. However, despite his appearance, he still retains all the strength of his glory days. Hercules takes a lot of pride in his office, which showcases his famed accomplishments, which he proudly speaks of. He loves doughnuts, talks like a tough guy, and wears socks, a blue-striped kilt, and a muscle shirt which displays his thick body hair.
Hermes (voiced by Brian Drummond) – Odie's mentor, who is the messenger of the gods and the god of boundaries, invention, commerce, and travelers. He was the one who was sent to retrieve the first six students, and also had to spin an elaborate tale for Jay's parents to explain his absence. Hermes is in charge of monitoring the gods' global networks and communication systems, which have since been enhanced by Odie's installation of high-speed telephones. He has a secret portal in his room emblazoned with the caduceus that can transport anyone to anywhere they wish. His caduceus is the symbol of heralds, and he can use it to control animals. He is depicted as a somewhat hyperactive and skinny young man wearing a winged pilot cap, goggles, and winged boots. He is a clever and gifted inventor, something he shares with his student, Odie. He is more relaxed and less demanding than the other gods; in addition, he is most familiar with the human world and the way it works.
Morpheus (voiced by Stephen Dimopoulos) - The god of sleep, who appears as a laid-back, slightly overweight and short man who resides in the realm of dreams.
Nemesis (voiced by Nicole Oliver) - The goddess of vengeance, who takes the form of a blindfolded woman carrying a sword and a pair of scales.
Pan (voiced by Mark Hildreth) - The god of the wild. Disguised as a student at New Olympia named Phil, Pan is known locally as DJ Panic, a DJ popular with the ladies and even attracted the attention of Atlanta who had never been romantically attracted to others before. However, he secretly wreaks havoc using hypnotizing trance music and controlling plants, particularly vines.
Persephone (voiced by Tabitha St. Germain) – Theresa's mentor and the queen of the underworld. She is tall, young, and possesses two distinct temperaments – one gentle and light-hearted, and the other uncontrollable and spiteful, brought out when she is angry. To fulfill her agreement to spend half her time in the Underworld with her husband Hades, Persephone has in her solarium a secret passageway to his realm which allows the heroes' access to the Underworld without fulfilling the usual requirement of being dead. She seems to be fond of gardening, not surprisingly given that she is a goddess of spring and the daughter of Demeter. She also appears to share a loving relationship with her husband and their "puppy," Cerberus. Her connection to the supernatural and vast wealth is something she shares with her student Theresa.
Poseidon (voiced by French Tickner) - The god of the sea, who wields a large trident that can be used to control water, though he also seems to be able to exert some control over water without it. He is usually depicted as a giant merman with a blueish-green beard, fins on his head and arms, and a crown made of shells.
Psyche (voiced by Tabitha St. Germain) - The goddess of the soul and wife of Eros.
Thanatos (voiced by Trevor Devall) - The god of death, who serves whoever wears Hades's Helmet of Darkness. He appears as a mild-mannered and soft-spoken middle-aged man, but his true form is a skeletal winged creature who is able to appear from shadows and dissipate into the air.
Zeus (voiced by Christopher Gaze) – The king of the gods, god of thunder, and husband to Hera. He is depicted as a grumpy-looking bearded man who is rather disorganized and absent-minded, a result of using up his powers to send the Chosen Ones back to the future after their role in thwarting Cronus' victory at the Titanomachy. In his youth, however, he had blond hair and appeared muscular.

Others
Charon (voiced by Jeff Bennett) - The ferryman of the Underworld, who wears a hooded robe that leaves only his eyes and mouth visible.
 King Minos (voiced by Trevor Devall) - The king of Crete, who became one of the three judges of the underworld after his death.

Monsters
There are various monsters that appear in the series:
Campe (voiced by Pam Hyatt in season 1, Pauline Newstone in season 2) - The staff-wielding Jailer of Tartarus, who is mostly humanoid, though with the lower body of a snake and a live scorpion on her back that can detach itself off of her body at will.
Cerberus - A three-headed hellhound with three skeletal heads and a snake-headed tail who guards the entrance to the underworld to prevent its residents from escaping.
Chimera - The Chimera is a hybrid monster that has the head and front legs of a lion, the back legs of a goat with its head emerging from its back, and a cobra-headed tail. In "Road to Hades," Jay was poisoned by the Chimera when it was brought back by Cronus, and the other heroes rushed through the Underworld in hopes of finding the one thing that would be able to restore him.
Giants - The henchmen of Cronus, who Cronus can change to have the characteristics of different animals. They are very strong but seem to have low intelligence.
Gorgon - Ugly, humanoid women with wrinkled grey skin, yellow eyes, sharp spikes along their arms and legs, and venomous black snakes in place of hair. They can turn others to stone through contact with them.
Kraken - A giant green-skinned merman who Cronus awakened to get revenge on Poseidon.
Manticore - A lion-like creature with dragon-like wings and a scorpion tail who is able to shoot poisonous spikes to either paralyze or kill its victims.
Minotaur - A creature with the head and hindquarters of a bull and the torso and arms of a man.
Sphinx - A treacherous and merciless creature with the haunches of a lion, bird-like wings, and a feminine human face. She gives riddles to people and kills whoever cannot answer them.
Sirens - A trio of female monsters known for their beautiful, seductive songs that lure men to their deaths. They initially appear as three very beautiful young women, but their true forms are ugly, serpent-like, bird-like creatures.
Sybaris - A female serpentine monster with the tail of a snake, bat wings, snake-bat-shaped face, and sharp teeth. In the show, she is shown to be a vampire.
Telkhines - Dog-faced sea monsters with flippers in place of hands who are powerful alchemists and blacksmiths.
Typhoeus - A large red humanoid creature with luminous green eyes, two snakes in place of legs, and leathery wings who was freed from his prison in Mount Etna by Cronus in "Chaos 101", but defeated by Archie and Atlanta.

Locations
 Aeolia – The floating island of Aeolus, Keeper of the Winds, though it is never referred to by name. The island is more like a small rocky mountain resting on the back of a giant sea turtle with a temple at the top where Aeolus can command the four winds.
Atlantis – The ancient civilization and continent that the Greek gods punished by sinking into the sea using the Antikythera Device. A giant statue of Poseidon can be found in the main temple, but was destroyed when Jay and Theresa set off explosives in it to destroy the Device that lay inside.
 The Brownstone – The building complex that serves as a dormitory for the heroes. The building is protected from Cronus and his minions, though not from other threats like Campe, the jailer of Tartarus. Each of the seven heroes has their own separate room fitted in a way that matches their personalities. Jay's room has the theme of sailing and also makes references to the Golden Fleece retrieved by his ancestor. Atlanta's room expresses her interest in sports and the environment while Theresa's room shows her spiritual interests. Not surprisingly, Odie's room in the basement is filled with technological components and his computers while Neil, given his self-absorbed nature, contains many mirrors and things related to his modelling career. As seen in the director Brad Goodchild's blog, Herry's room is centred around his interest in bodybuilding while Archie's room has a Japanese theme, fitting in with his love of poetry.
Crete – A tiny volcanic island that is also the home of Talos and Hephaestus' original workshop.
 The Garden of the Hesperides – A sacred garden of Hera's where golden apples of immortality grew on trees. It was guarded by the Hesperides as well as a dragon known as Ladon.
Greece - The country of origin for the original Titans. The new Titans visit it on two occasions.
Lerna – A region of ancient Greece characterized by swampy springs. It is also the home to the Hydra, the many-headed water-serpent.
Mount Caucasus – The Russian mountain that Zeus chained Prometheus to as punishment for stealing fire from the gods. In the modern day, the mountain is the location for the Temple of Prometheus, where a fire can be lit to summon the eagle which ate Prometheus' liver each day. Cronus and his giants bring Herry's Granny there as a hostage, and the heroes travel to the mountains by using gliders and Hermes' portal.
Nemea – A town in classical Greece home to the Nemean Lion, whose defeat was the first of Hercules' Twelve Labours.
 New Olympia – The fictional city the heroes are summoned to. The Greek gods have since moved from their Mount Olympus in order to stay safe from Cronus, as well as to oversee, train and protect the seven teenage heroes. It is apparently located somewhere in Canada.
 Olympus High School – New Olympia's high school, built with a Greek architecture theme in mind. The seven heroes attend the school as students, as do the city's other non-heroic teenagers. The Greek gods reside in a secret part of the school accessible only through the janitor closet with special medallion keys that each of the heroes has. In this part of the school, there are training facilities, weapon stores, secret portals, Hephaestus' workshop, etc. Many statues also decorate the building, including ones of Zeus armed with thunderbolts and Asclepius with his Asclepian rod. It is under the protection of the gods, and therefore undetectable by Cronus. The school was also invulnerable to the timeline change Cronus made by winning the Titanomachy.
Ogygia – Calypso's tropical island paradise, where Odysseus was stranded and kept for seven years during his journey home. It has generally beautiful weather and is characterized by its sandy beaches and palm trees.
Plains of Asphodel – In Greek mythology, asphodel is a plant sacred to Persephone and grows in the Underworld. There is an entire field of aconite growing in the field, but anyone who steps off the path to enter will turn to stone. Odie solved the problem by putting the path's dirt into his shoe so technically he is still on the path.
 The Underworld – The ancient Greek realm of the dead, ruled over by Hades and his wife Persephone. The three-headed dog Cerberus guards its gates, Campe guards its prisoners, Minos judges the entering souls, and Charon ferries the dead across the river, but only if you pay him with gold coins. The deepest area is Tartarus, where Cronus was imprisoned after his defeat at the hands of Zeus. Heroes reside in Elysium, the one place in the underworld that isn't dark and gloomy, but idyllic and peaceful instead. You must be dead in order to enter, although the heroes circumvent this rule by sneaking through the picture of the Seasons in Persephone's solarium.

Episodes

Notes

References
 Andrew Borkowski, TV Guide: "It's all Greek to me". Toronto: Transcontinental Media, January 21–27th, 2005.

External links

 Lead character designer (Season 2) Jeremy Tin's blog
 The Unofficial 'Class of the Titans' FAQ
 Show page at Nelvana website 
 

2005 Canadian television series debuts
2008 Canadian television series endings
2000s Canadian animated television series
2000s Canadian high school television series
Canadian children's animated action television series
Canadian children's animated comic science fiction television series
Canadian children's animated science fantasy television series
English-language television shows
Television series based on classical mythology
Television series by Nelvana
Television series by DHX Media
Teletoon original programming
Teen animated television series
Television shows filmed in Toronto
Television shows filmed in Vancouver
Television shows set in Vancouver
Greek and Roman deities in fiction